Edwin Ipape (born 1999) is a Papua New Guinean professional rugby league footballer who plays as a  for the Leigh Leopards in the  Betfred Super League and Papua New Guinea at international level.

Career
Ipape made his international debut for Papua New Guinea in their 24-6 defeat by Samoa in the 2019 Oceania Cup.

Ipape was on a train and trial contract with the Manly Warringah Sea Eagles as part of their 2020 pre season. He played two games for the  Manly 9s team during the NRL 9s.

On 28 May 2022, Ipape played for the Leigh Centurions in their 2022 RFL 1895 Cup final victory over Featherstone Rovers.

On 3 October 2022, Ipape played for the Leigh Centurions in their Million Pound Game victory over the Batley Bulldogs which saw the club promoted back to the Super League.

In October he was named in the Papua New Guinea squad for the 2021 Rugby League World Cup.

In November he was named in the 2021 RLWC Team of the Tournament.

References

External links
Leigh Leopards profile
PNG Hunters profile
Manly Warringah Sea Eagles profile

1999 births
Living people
Lae Snax Tigers players
Papua New Guinea Hunters players
Papua New Guinea national rugby league team players
Papua New Guinean rugby league players
Rugby league five-eighths
People from the Western Highlands Province
Leigh Leopards players